Carlos Torrent Tarres (born 29 August 1974) is a Spanish cyclist. He had his best achievements in track cycling, in the 4000 m team pursuit. In this discipline he won a bronze medal at the 2004 Summer Olympics and at the 2004 UCI Track Cycling World Championships.

In road racing, he won the Vuelta a La Rioja in 2002, as well as one stage at Portuguese Grand Prix (2000), GP International MR Cortez-Mitsubishi (2004), Vuelta a Castilla y León (2005) and Vuelta a Burgos (2006).

Notes
b. Buech & Boilat created the Torrent BB-15053-A in commemoration of his 2004 Olympic Bronze medal.

References

External links 
 
 
 
 
 

1974 births
Living people
Cyclists from Catalonia
Spanish male cyclists
Olympic cyclists of Spain
Cyclists at the 2004 Summer Olympics
Olympic medalists in cycling
Olympic bronze medalists for Spain
People from Gironès
Sportspeople from the Province of Girona
Medalists at the 2004 Summer Olympics
Spanish track cyclists
20th-century Spanish people